A365 may refer to:

 A365 road (Great Britain), a main road in Great Britain
 RFA Surf Pioneer (A365), a British fleet auxiliary vessel